Hixxy, or DJ Hixxy, (real name Ian Hicks, born 1975) is a British disc jockey and electronic music producer known for his innovative work in the UK happy hardcore scene, co-founding the Raver Baby record label, and the Bonkers compilation album series.

Career
Hixxy came to prominence in 1995 when he and DJ Sharkey released their track "Toytown", which is considered "a classic of the genre, a riot of scruffy breaks and sugar-sweet vocals that signalled a schism in rave history when it was released".  Being considered pivotal in the hardcore scene, "Toytown" led to React Music releasing the first of the Bonkers compilations in 1996, with Hixxy and Sharkey mixing.  The Bonkers series stretched to 19 volumes, with Hixxy as a regular contributor, and while critical reception was varied, the series was credited as the "dawning of a new era" in the UK rave music scene.

By the early 2000s Hixxy's sound had evolved, releasing tracks that adopted the more mainstream trance sound but with hardcore-inspired beats per minute.  In 2004 Hixxy founded Hardcore Till I Die, a business for his musical events, through his record label Raver Baby.  That same year John Peel, a BBC Radio 1 DJ who was a supporter of the hardcore scene, invited Hixxy to do a mix on his show.    The mix was subsequently released on CD by React Music under the title Bonkers: Hixxy Mix as Heard on the John Peel Show.  The following year Hixxy partnered with Darren Styles to follow up the Bonkers series by initiating another popular compilation mix series called Clubland X-Treme Hardcore, which fellow artist MC Storm claimed to be "another massive turning point for hardcore".

Hixxy has a prolific touring and performance record, both nationally in the UK and internationally with shows in the United States and Australia.  As of 2023 Hixxy continues to perform live, often with fellow hardcore innovators such as DJ Dougal at events including the Bang Face Weekender in Southport.

Discography
Selected singles

Selected mix albums

See also
 Kutski
 Gammer
 Slipmatt

References

External links
 

Living people
British DJs
Happy hardcore musicians
UK hardcore musicians
1975 births